Jordan Dickerson (born June 9, 1993) is an American professional basketball player who last played for BC Batumi of the Georgian Superliga. Standing at 2.16 m (7'1"), he plays at the center position. After playing one year of college basketball at SMU and three years at Penn State, Dickerson entered the 2016 NBA draft, but he was not selected in the draft's two rounds.

Professional career
After going undrafted in the 2016 NBA draft, Dickerson joined Bashkimi Prizren of the ETC Superliga. On December, he left Bashkimi and joined Promitheas Patras of the Greek Basket League.

On October 2, 2017, Dickerson joined Koroivos of the Greek Basket League. His monthly contract was not renewed at first but one day later he signed another monthly contract. He ultimately left the team on December 29 of the same year.

References

External links
Penn State Nittany Lions bio
Eurobasket.com Profile
ESPN Profile 
Greek Basket League Profile 

1993 births
Living people
Abraham Lincoln High School (Brooklyn) alumni
American expatriate basketball people in Georgia (country)
American expatriate basketball people in Greece
American expatriate basketball people in Kosovo
Basketball players from New York City
Bashkimi Prizren players
Centers (basketball)
Koroivos B.C. players
Penn State Nittany Lions basketball players
Promitheas Patras B.C. players
SMU Mustangs men's basketball players
Sportspeople from Brooklyn
American men's basketball players